At the 1992 Summer Olympics in Barcelona, Spain, 31 swimming events were contested. There was a total of 641 participants from 92 countries competing.

Medal table

Medal summary

Men's events

* Swimmers who participated in the heats only and received medals.

Women's events

* Swimmers who participated in the heats only and received medals.

Participating nations
641 swimmers from 92 nations competed.

References

External links
Official Olympic Report

 
1992 Summer Olympics events
1992
1992 in swimming